Napoleon Township is one of the thirteen townships of Henry County, Ohio, United States. As of the 2010 census the population was 9,796, of whom 1,551 lived in the unincorporated portion of the township.

Geography
Located in the western part of the county, it borders the following townships:
Freedom Township - north
Liberty Township - northeast
Harrison Township - east
Monroe Township - southeast corner
Flatrock Township - south
Richland Township, Defiance County - southwest corner
Adams Township, Defiance County - west
Ridgeville Township - northwest corner

Most of the city of Napoleon, the county seat of Henry County, is located in the eastern half of Napoleon Township, and the unincorporated community of Okolona lies in the township's southwest.

Name and history
It is the only Napoleon Township statewide.

Government
The township is governed by a three-member board of trustees, who are elected in November of odd-numbered years to a four-year term beginning on the following January 1. Two are elected in the year after the presidential election and one is elected in the year before it. There is also an elected township fiscal officer, who serves a four-year term beginning on April 1 of the year after the election, which is held in November of the year before the presidential election. Vacancies in the fiscal officership or on the board of trustees are filled by the remaining trustees.

Public education for the township is administered by the Napoleon Area City School District.

References

External links
County website

Townships in Henry County, Ohio
Townships in Ohio